The 2006–07 Sussex County Football League season was the 82nd in the history of Sussex County Football League a football competition in England.

Division One

Division One featured 18 clubs which competed in the division last season, along with two new clubs, promoted from Division Two:
Oakwood
Selsey

Also, Rye & Iden United changed name to Rye United.

League table

Division Two

Division Two featured 15 clubs which competed in the division last season, along with three new clubs:
Lingfield, promoted from Division Three
Peacehaven & Telscombe, promoted from Division Three
Southwick, relegated from Division One

League table

Division Three

Division Three featured ten clubs which competed in the division last season, along with three new clubs:
Bexhill United, relegated from Division Two
Loxwood, joined from the West Sussex League
Rottingdean Village, joined from the Brighton, Hove & District Football League

League table

References

2006-07
9